Aufi can refer to:

Aufi Tower, Aufhausen, Germany
Zahiriddin Nasr Muhammad Aufi (1171-1242), a medieval Persian author
Abdul-Rahim Hamed Aufi (born 1963), Iraqi soccer player
Saleh Al-Aufi (died 2005), member of al-Qaeda in Saudi Arabia